The Wave Transit System is the operator of public transportation in Mobile, Alabama, operated by the City of Mobile. Eleven local routes service the city and suburban regions, while the modal trolley provides downtown shuttle service. Crossbay service via the Baylinc route service Baldwin County, Alabama. The cities of Spanish Fort, Daphne, Fairhope, and Point Clear have bus access to Downtown Mobile via US 98 and US 90.

History

Mobile's public transportation was started in 1860 as the Mobile and Spring Hill Railway, a mule-drawn trolley system. In 1892, the line was acquired by  J. Howard Wilson and electrified. In 1893 Mobile Light & Railway was formed by the consolidation of the Mobile Electric Railway and the Mobile Electric Light & Power. In 1897, Mobile and Spring Hill Railway was combined into Mobile Light & Railway to form the Mobile Light & Railroad

Another system was started in 1887 under similar ownership as the Mobile and Spring Hill under the name Mobile Street Railway. It was sold in foreclosure in 1892 and was renamed the Mobile Street Railroad. By 1903, the Mobile Street Railroad was combined into Mobile Light & Railroad. After the death of J. Howard Wilson in 1939, Mobile Light & Railroad was acquired by National City Lines and renamed Mobile City Lines. Mobile City Lines converted the system to buses. In 1971, the bus lines were taken over by the Mobile Transit Authority. Mobile Transit Authority collapsed in 1995 and the operations were taken over by the City of Mobile under the name Metro Transit. In 2005, Metro Transit was renamed The Wave.

Route list

References

External links

 The Wave

Bus transportation in Alabama
Transportation in Mobile, Alabama